Opisthiamimus is an extinct genus of small-bodied eusphenodontian rhynchocephalian from the Upper Jurassic Morrison Formation of Northern Wyoming, United States. The type species, O. gregori, is known from four specimens, which together preserve a nearly complete skeleton. The genus was described in 2022 by David DeMar, Marc E. H. Jones, and Matthew Carrano. It was found that it was only distantly related to Eilenodon, Theretairus and Opisthias, the other known rhynchocephalians from the Morrison Formation.

References

Sphenodontia
Prehistoric reptile genera
Fossil taxa described in 2022